Unley is an inner-southern suburb of Adelaide, South Australia, within the City of Unley. The suburb is the home of the Sturt Football Club in the South Australian National Football League (SANFL). Unley neighbours Adelaide Park Lands, Fullarton, Hyde Park, Malvern, Parkside and Wayville.

The boundaries of Unley are Greenhill Road (north), Unley Road, Maud Street and Windsor Street (east), Cremorne Street and Opey Avenue (south) and King William Road (west).

Unley is the family name of the wife of Thomas Whistler, owner of land in Unley which was laid out around 1857.

History
Prior to British colonisation of South Australia, Unley was home to the Aboriginal nation known as the Kaurna, or Adelaide Plains tribe. Settlement by migrants began in the mid-19th century, with arrivals predominantly from United Kingdom of Great Britain and Ireland, and to a small extent German speaking lands. At this time a small number of other ethnic groups also appeared. The land was cleared of native forest to farm sheep and cattle and to plant vineyards and orchards.

Since then, it has developed into a commercial hub, just south of Adelaide's city centre. The suburb also has a significant Greek Australian population.

Unley Post Office opened on 17 January 1850.

The Glenelg tram line passes the northwest corner of the suburb and another line went along Unley Road until the 1960s.

Historic buildings

The Goodwood Institute was built in 1928, and now houses the Goodwood Theatre & Studios, a multi-purpose venue for the performing arts and music. Independent Theatre, an amateur theatre company run by Rob Croser, uses the venue for many of its performances.

The Ikaros Hall, formerly a Masonic Temple erected in 1927, is situated in Arthur Street, and home of the Pan-Ikarian Brotherhood of Australia, a Greek Australian diaspora community organisation founded by migrants from the island of Ikaria.

Demographics

Notable residents
Greg Chappell was born in Unley.
Ian Chappell was born in Unley.
Seth Ferry had racing stables and fox hunting kennels at the corner of Unley Road and Commercial Road.
John Lorenzo Young had his school and adjacent residence on Young Street.

See also
 List of Adelaide suburbs

References

External links
Unley City Council
Unley community profile
Unley Concert Band website
Unley Road Website for Shopping
Forestville Hockey Club

Suburbs of Adelaide
Populated places established in 1840